Xanthichthys mento, the redtail triggerfish, blue-throat triggerfish, or crosshatch triggerfish, is a species of triggerfish from the Pacific.

References

External links
 

Balistidae
Fish of Hawaii
Fish described in 1882
Taxa named by David Starr Jordan